Asura uniformeola is a moth of the family Erebidae. It was described by George Hampson in 1910. It is found on Borneo and Taiwan.

References

uniformeola
Moths described in 1900
Moths of Asia